Giovanni Saldarini (11 December 1924 – 18 April 2011) was an Italian Cardinal and Archbishop of Turin.

Early life
Saldarini was born in Cantù in the Italian province of Como, in Lombardy. He was educated at St Peter Martyr Seminary in Venegono and the Theological Faculty, Milan. He was ordained to the priesthood on 31 May 1947 in Milan, by Alfredo Schuster then Archbishop of Milan. He taught at the archiepiscopal school in Desio from 1947 until 1949. After further studies in Rome he was a faculty member at the Seminary of Venegono from 1952 until 1967. After this he worked as a parish priest in the archdiocese of Milan until 1982. He was named Honorary Prelate on 24 April 1979.

Episcopate
Pope John Paul II appointed him titular bishop of Gaudiaba and auxiliary bishop of Milan on 10 November 1984. He was consecrated that December by Cardinal Carlo Maria Martini, assisted by Cardinal Giovanni Colombo, (then Archbishop Emeritus of Milan). He remained as an auxiliary bishop of Milan until he was appointed Archbishop of Turin on 31 January 1989.

Cardinal
He was created and proclaimed Cardinal Priest of Sacro Cuore di Gesù a Castro Pretorio (deaconry elevated pro hac vice to presbyteral title) in the consistory of 28 June 1991. He resigned the pastoral government of the archdiocese because of bad health, at the age of 74 on 19 June 1999. After his resignation Saldarini resided in the parish of S. Francesco di Paola, via Montenapoleone. He lost the right to participate in a conclave when he turned 80 years old in 2004. Cardinal Saldarini died on 18 April 2011, in Clinica San Giuseppe, Milan, He was buried in the Cathedral of Turin.

References

Bibliography

Martin Bräuer,  Handbuch der Kardinäle: 1846-2012 (Berlin/Boston: Walter de Gruyter GmbH & Co KG, 2014).

1924 births
2011 deaths
People from Cantù
21st-century Italian cardinals
Archbishops of Turin
20th-century Italian Roman Catholic archbishops
Cardinals created by Pope John Paul II
20th-century Italian cardinals